Sir Ian William Dove (born 31 December 1963), styled The Hon. Mr Justice Dove, is a judge of the High Court of England and Wales.

He was educated at Northampton School for Boys and St Catherine's College, Oxford.

He was called to the bar at Inner Temple in 1986. He has been a judge of the High Court of Justice (King's Bench Division) since 1 October 2014.

Dove  was a practising barrister at No5 Barristers' Chambers before being appointed High Court Judge. He joined Chambers as a pupil in 1986 and rose through the ranks to be regarded as one of the brightest up and coming junior barristers in the UK and was appointed Queen's Counsel in 2003. He is a respected barrister in the Planning & Environmental & Public Law fields taking on many notable cases during his time at No5.

In December 2018 he presided over a challenge made against the Government by Friends of the Earth that the National Planning Policy Framework (NPPF) document issued July 2018 was unlawful because it should have been reviewed for its impacts on the environment.

On 2 October 2022, Sir Ian was appointed as President of the Immigration and Asylum Chamber in the Upper Tribunal.

References

1963 births
Living people
People educated at Northampton School for Boys
Alumni of St Catherine's College, Oxford
Members of the Inner Temple
Queen's Bench Division judges
Knights Bachelor